Graham Houston (born 24 February 1960 in Gibraltar) is a British former professional footballer who played in the Football League as a midfielder.
He became a police officer in Lancashire and made the news by tackling a man with a knife at while off duty.

References

1960 births
Living people
Gibraltarians
English footballers
Association football wingers
Preston North End F.C. players
Burnley F.C. players
Southport F.C. players
Wigan Athletic F.C. players
Carlisle United F.C. players
Northwich Victoria F.C. players
Colne Dynamoes F.C. players
Morecambe F.C. players
Skelmersdale United F.C. players
Chorley F.C. players
National League (English football) players
English Football League players